De Hooge Heerlijkheid is a restaurant in Middelharnis, Netherlands. It was a fine dining restaurant that was awarded one Michelin star in the periods 1975-1992 and 1995-1996.

Owner and then head chef John Kern was one of the founders of Les Patrons Cuisiniers.

John and Wieke Kern founded the restaurant in 1969. They developed the restaurant from a pancake-restaurant to a Michelin starred restaurant. Later his son Mark Kern took over the restaurant. In 2011, Mark Kern handed over the kitchen of De Hooge Heerlijkheid to Maurice Montero Lowes and started a fish shop and wholesale under the name "Poisson & Cuisine". The restaurant is now only open to groups.

See also
List of Michelin starred restaurants in the Netherlands

References 

Restaurants in the Netherlands
Michelin Guide starred restaurants in the Netherlands
Goeree-Overflakkee